Nicky Evrard (born 26 May 1995) is a Belgian footballer who plays as a goalkeeper for OH Leuven and the Belgium women's national team.

Club career
Evrard started her career at Racing Strijpen and SK Munkzwalm boys teams. In the 2011–12 season, she signed with Cercle Melle. In 2012, the team change its name to AA Gent. In the 2016–17 season, she won the Cup of Belgium with AA Gent. On 17 May 2017, Evrard announced that she would be joining FC Twente.

International career
From 2009 to April 2013, Evrard was part of several Belgium's youth teams. On 2 June 2013, she played for Belgium senior team for the first time in a friendly match against Ukraine. Evrard was also part of the team who represented Belgium at the UEFA Women's Euro 2017. Evrard was in the national team in 2022. The other two goalkeepers in the national team were Lisa Lichtfus who plays for Dijon and Diede Lemey who at the time played for Sassuolo.

Evrard was the first-choice goalkeeper for Belgium's UEFA Women's Euro 2022 campaign in England. She was vital to their progression to the quarter-finals despite not being amongst the heavy favourites in their group, and saved both penalties she faced in the group stages, one each against Iceland and France.

Personal life
Like many of her Belgium teammates, Evrard is semi-professional and when she is not playing football, she is an entrepreneur with her own business renting out bouncy castles.
Evrard lives in a same-sex relationship with Belgian footballer Shari Van Belle.

References

External links
 Player's Profile at UEFA
 
 

1995 births
Living people
Women's association football goalkeepers
Belgian women's footballers
Footballers from East Flanders
People from Zottegem
Belgium women's international footballers
BeNe League players
Super League Vrouwenvoetbal players
K.A.A. Gent (women) players
Eredivisie (women) players
FC Twente (women) players
Belgian expatriate footballers
Belgian expatriate sportspeople in the Netherlands
Belgian expatriate sportspeople in Spain
Expatriate women's footballers in the Netherlands
Expatriate women's footballers in Spain
UEFA Women's Euro 2022 players
UEFA Women's Euro 2017 players
Belgian lesbians
Belgium LGBT sportspeople
LGBT association football players
Lesbian sportswomen
21st-century Belgian LGBT people